Saint-Jérôme station is an intermodal transit station in Saint-Jérôme, Quebec, Canada. It serves Exo and intercity buses as well as Exo commuter rail trains on the Saint-Jérôme line.

Description
It serves bus routes operated by the CIT Laurentides, a suburban transit agency, and by two intercity bus companies. In addition to loading areas for buses, it includes train platforms which are used by the Saint-Jérôme line. The line is operated by the Réseau de transport métropolitain (RTM), the umbrella organization that integrates and coordinates public transportation services in the Greater Montreal area. Commuter trains towards Montreal began serving the station on Monday, January 8, 2007, with four (of 10) trains on weekdays. The ride from Saint-Jérôme to Lucien-L'Allier station takes 85 minutes. Saint-Jérôme is in ARTM fare zone C, and the station currently has parking for 775 cars. Prior to the reform of the ARTM's fare system in July 2022, it was in zone 7.

The station is built primarily of wood,  drawing its inspiration from the former Canadian Pacific Railway station in Saint-Jérôme and from industrial architecture of the 1900s.

The former Canadian Pacific Railway station in Saint-Jérôme at 160, rue de la Gare (in the former civic numbering, 301 Sainte-Anne Street) was designated in 1994 as a heritage railway station by the Historic Sites and Monuments Board of Canada, and is now used as an exhibition space and events facility.

Location
Some documents give the station's address as 455, boul. Jean-Baptiste-Rolland E. in Saint-Jérôme, but the address is more commonly shown as 280, rue Latour.

Connecting bus routes

Intercity buses

References

External links
 CIT Laurentides
 Route List
 Route Maps
 Transport adapté et collectif des Laurentides, formerly Transport Collectif Intermunicipal Laurentides (TCIL)
 Saint-Jérôme station page on official RTM website (In French)

Exo commuter rail stations
Exo bus stations
Railway stations in Canada opened in 2007
Buildings and structures in Saint-Jérôme
Railway stations in Laurentides